Hillcrest  is a suburb of Rotorua in the Bay of Plenty Region of New Zealand's North Island.

Demographics

Hillcrest had a population of 1,917 at the 2018 New Zealand census, an increase of 294 people (18.1%) since the 2013 census, and an increase of 201 people (11.7%) since the 2006 census. There were 561 households, comprising 942 males and 972 females, giving a sex ratio of 0.97 males per female. The median age was 29.8 years (compared with 37.4 years nationally), with 507 people (26.4%) aged under 15 years, 456 (23.8%) aged 15 to 29, 780 (40.7%) aged 30 to 64, and 171 (8.9%) aged 65 or older.

Ethnicities were 58.2% European/Pākehā, 42.3% Māori, 7.4% Pacific peoples, 12.4% Asian, and 1.3% other ethnicities. People may identify with more than one ethnicity.

The percentage of people born overseas was 19.2, compared with 27.1% nationally.

Although some people chose not to answer the census's question about religious affiliation, 51.3% had no religion, 31.9% were Christian, 4.1% had Māori religious beliefs, 3.8% were Hindu, 0.3% were Muslim, 0.3% were Buddhist and 2.3% had other religions.

Of those at least 15 years old, 249 (17.7%) people had a bachelor's or higher degree, and 210 (14.9%) people had no formal qualifications. The median income was $27,400, compared with $31,800 nationally. 156 people (11.1%) earned over $70,000 compared to 17.2% nationally. The employment status of those at least 15 was that 720 (51.1%) people were employed full-time, 216 (15.3%) were part-time, and 87 (6.2%) were unemployed.

Education

The school was formed in 1959 when Rotorua High School was split into single-sex schools, with Rotorua Boys' High School continuing on the original site. The school had substantial rebuilding of facilities at the turn of the 21st century.

References

Suburbs of Rotorua
Populated places in the Bay of Plenty Region